There are two species of gecko named Pilbara ground gecko:
 Lucasium woodwardi
 Lucasium wombeyi